Don Lane (1933–2009) was a talk show host and singer.

Don Lane may also refer to:

 Don Lane (politician) (1935–1995), Australian politician
 Don Lane (Santa Cruz) (born 1956), mayor of Santa Cruz, California
 Donald Edward Lane (1909–1979), judge